R. Borlax is the debut album by Horse the Band, released in 2003 on Pluto Records. It was re-released in 2007 with two bonus tracks by Koch Records. As with all Horse the Band recordings, the keyboards are used to mimic the 8-bit sound produced by the Nintendo Entertainment System. This is the band's only release with bassist Andy Stokes and the last with drummer Jason Karuza.

Track listing

The track "Purple" opens and ends with short audio samples from the film Mulholland Drive. The track "Cutsman" opens  and ends with audio samples from the film The Wizard.

Personnel
 Nathan Winneke – lead vocals
 David Isen – guitar
 Andy Stokes – bass
 Erik Engstrom – keyboards, backing vocals
 Jason Karuza – drums

References

Horse the Band albums
2003 albums